Sergei Gavrilov may refer to the following:
Sergei Gavrilov (football player)
Sergei Gavrilov (politician)